The Nikitin PSN-1 was a piloted glider anti-shipping missile produced in the USSR from 1937.

Development
From 1933 a series of special projects was initiated under the PSN banner (Planer Spetsial'nogo Naznachenaya - Glider for Special Purposes). A proposal was made by S.F. Valk for a glider anti-shipping bomb with Infra-Red guidance, which was expanded to include DPT (long-range glider torpedo), LTDD (Long-range flying torpedo) and BMP (towed mine glider). To evaluate the Kvant Infra-Red guidance a piloted version was produced as the Nikitin PSN-1. Nikitin and Mikhelson designed a small single-seat monoplane flying boat glider with floats at approx 1/2 span, carrying a torpedo underneath. The PSN-1 was carried aloft by either Tupolev TB-3 or Tupolev TB-7 motherships and released at the appropriate height.

At least 10 were built and many of these were flown during trials of the autopilot and the Kvant (Quantum) guidance system.

Specifications (PSN-1)

See also

References

 Gunston, Bill. "Encyclopedia of Russian Aircraft 1875-1995". London:Osprey. 1995.

External links
 https://web.archive.org/web/20080314052226/http://www.aviation.ru/Nikitin/

Glider aircraft
1930s Soviet experimental aircraft
Flying boats
PSN-1
High-wing aircraft
World War II guided missiles